Achim Reichel (born 28 January 1944) is a musician, producer, and songwriter from Hamburg, Germany. He is known for his 1991 hit single Aloha Heja He, and serving as the frontman for the 1960s beat group The Rattles, who, among other achievements, were selected to open for The Beatles on their last tour of Europe in 1966.

In 1968, he co-founded the psychedelic pop group Wonderland, which also included English ex-patriate Les Humphries who would soon start his own Les Humphries Singers. In 1971, Reichel left the group for his own progressive Krautrock solo project, A. R. & Machines, of which the first album Die grüne Reise (The green journey) was critically acclaimed and likened to bands such as Kraftwerk and Tangerine Dream.

Since 1975, Reichel has taken a keen interest in recording traditional German songs and classic poetry as modern-style music, which includes such albums as Dat Shanty Alb'm (1975), Klabautermann (1977), Regenballade (1977), Fledermaus (1988), Wilder Wassermann (2002), and Volxlieder (2006).

In 2021, the 30 year old song Aloha Heja He became a great success in China.

Discography 
 Dat Shanty Alb’m (1976)
 Klabautermann (1977)
 Regenballade (1977)
 Heiße Scheibe (1979)
 Ungeschminkt (1980)
 Blues in Blond (1981)
 Nachtexpress (1983)
 Eine Ewigkeit unterwegs (1986)
 Fledermaus (1988)
 Was Echtes (1989)
 Melancholie und Sturmflut (1991)
 Wahre Liebe (1993)
 Nachtexpress (1994)
 Große Freiheit (1994)
 Oh ha! (1996)
 Herz ist Trumpf – Das Beste von Achim Reichel (1997, best-of) 
 Entspann dich (1999)
 Wilder Wassermann – Balladen & Mythen (2002)
 100 % Leben (2004, live album)
 Volxlieder (2006)
 Michels Gold (2008)
 Solo mit euch – Mein Leben, meine Musik, gesungen und erzählt (2010, live album)
 Raureif (2015)
 Das Beste (2019)

With A.R. & Machines 
 Die grüne Reise (1971)
 Echo (1972)
 AR3 (1972)
 AR IV (1973)
 AR5 Autovision (1974)
 Erholung (A.R. & Machines Live) (1973)

References

External links 

1944 births
Living people
German singer-songwriters
German male singers
Musicians from Hamburg
Brain Records artists